Aleynikovo is a rural locality (a selo) in Aleynikovskoye Rural Settlement, Rossoshansky District, Voronezh Oblast, Russia. The population was 536 as of 2010. There are 3 streets.

Geography 
Aleynikovo is located 21 km northeast of Rossosh (the district's administrative centre) by road. Pavlovka is the nearest rural locality.

References 

Rural localities in Rossoshansky District